Fang, was a Chinese scientist and alchemist who lived during the first century B.C during the Han dynasty.  She was the earliest recorded woman alchemist in China.

She is only known under her family name Fang. Raised in a scholarly family skilled in the alchemical arts, she studied alchemy with one of the Emperor Han Wudi's spouses and thus had access to the highest levels of society. Fang's husband was Cheng Wei.

Fang was credited with the discovery of the method to turn mercury into silver. It was believed that she may have used the chemical technique of silver extraction from ores using mercury, where pure silver residue is left behind from the boiled mercury. 

Fang eventually went insane and committed suicide. Details of Fang's life were recorded by author and alchemist Ge Hong.

Notes and references 

1st-century BC Chinese women
1st-century BC Chinese people
Ancient Chinese scientists
Ancient women scientists
Chinese alchemists
Ancient alchemists